Cobble may refer to:

 Cobble (geology), a designation of particle size for sediment or clastic rock
 Cobblestone, partially rounded rocks used for road paving
 Hammerstone, a prehistoric stone tool
 Tyringham Cobble, a nature reserve in Tyringham, Massachusetts, U.S.
 Bartholomew's Cobble, a park near Sheffield, Massachusetts, U.S.
 Dorothy Sue Cobble (born 1949), American historian

See also
 Coble, a shallow-bottomed, low-draught fishing boat
 Cobbler (disambiguation)
 Kabul, the capital city of Afghanistan
 Cobblestone (disambiguation)